Geremy Davis (born January 10, 1992) is a gridiron football wide receiver who is a free agent. He played college football at University of Connecticut.

College career
Davis set UConn FBS records with 165 career receptions and 2,292 career receiving yards. He caught a pass in every game that he played in for the University of Connecticut.

Professional career

New York Giants
Davis was drafted by the New York Giants in the sixth round, 186th overall, of the 2015 NFL Draft. He recorded his first career NFL reception in Week 2 of the 2015 NFL season in the Giants 20-24 loss to the Atlanta Falcons.

On September 3, 2016, Davis was released by the Giants and was signed to the practice squad the next day.

San Diego / Los Angeles Chargers
On November 9, 2016, Davis was signed by the Chargers off the Giants' practice squad.

On September 3, 2017, Davis was waived by the Chargers and was signed to the practice squad the next day. He was promoted to the active roster on September 11, 2017. He was waived on September 16, 2017 and re-signed to the practice squad. He was promoted back to the active roster on October 26, 2017.

On March 12, 2018, Davis re-signed with the Chargers.

On March 19, 2019, Davis re-signed with the Chargers. He was placed on injured reserve on November 30, 2019.

Detroit Lions
On March 30, 2020, Davis was signed by the Detroit Lions. He was released on September 1, 2020.

Toronto Argonauts
On February 12, 2021, Davis signed with the Toronto Argonauts of the Canadian Football League (CFL). He was released on July 20, 2021.

References

1992 births
Living people
People from Lawrenceville, Georgia
Sportspeople from the Atlanta metropolitan area
Players of American football from Georgia (U.S. state)
American football wide receivers
Norcross High School alumni
UConn Huskies football players
New York Giants players
San Diego Chargers players
Los Angeles Chargers players
Detroit Lions players
Toronto Argonauts players